The Fusillade de Fourmies is an event which happened on 1 May 1891 in Fourmies, in the French Nord department. This day, the troop fired on a peaceful demonstration of workers claiming "C'est les huit heures qu'il nous faut !" (it's the eight-hour day we need), killing nine people and injuring 35 others.

Context 
Fourmies was a small town of 2000 people at the beginning of the 19th century, but it had an important industrial growth because of the textile industry. In 1891, it had 37 silk and wool mills, and  15 000 people, in majority factory workers.

In the factories, workers worked for 12 hours a day, and six days a week. Their salaries were particularly low.

Starting in 1885, the textile industry in the Nord began to experience difficulties. These difficulties had direct repercussions on workers, with unemployment and salary reductions when  food and lodging expenses were rising.

History

Call to strike 
The right to strike was allowed in France since The Ollivier law on 25 May 1864, but the Trade unions were allowed only since the Waldeck-Rousseau law on 21 March 1884.

Bibliography 
 André Pierrard, Jean-Louis Chappat, La Fusillade de Fourmies : Premier mai 1891, Maxima, Paris, 1991 
 Madeleine Rebérioux, Fourmies et les Premier mai, Fourmies Colloquium 1891/1991 (1991), Éditions de l'Atelier, 1994, 
 Odette Hardy-Hémery, L'envers d'une fusillade : Fourmies, 1er mai 1891, L'Harmattan, coll. « Collection Chemins de la mémoire », 2000 
 Justinien Raymond, Hippolyte Culine, Dictionnaire biographique, mouvement ouvrier, mouvement social, « Le Maitron », 2010.

References

Fusillade